Dimitrios Gerontaris (born 18 June 1952) is a Greek sailor. He competed in the 470 event at the 1976 Summer Olympics.

References

External links
 

1952 births
Living people
Greek male sailors (sport)
Olympic sailors of Greece
Sailors at the 1976 Summer Olympics – 470
Place of birth missing (living people)